Elvis: The Concert is a concert tour started in 1997 that features audio and video recordings of Elvis Presley, accompanied live by his 1970s backup band.

Origins 

In the mid-1990s, Elvis Presley Enterprises started experimenting with recordings of Presley's live concerts, and discovered that through the use of sound mixing they were able to eliminate virtually all of the ambient noise from the multitrack recordings, thus leaving only Presley's voice. After some work, they conceived a special concert to be held on August 16, 1997, the twentieth anniversary of Presley's death. The show featured Presley's original 1970s back-up band (TCB Band) and his backup singers (The Stamps Quartet, The Imperials, The Sweet Inspirations and Millie Kirkham) and was performed at Memphis, Tennessee's Mid-South Coliseum. During the show, Priscilla Presley introduced a video that Lisa Marie Presley made. The video was of Lisa Marie performing a duet with her father on the song "Don't Cry Daddy". It was so successful that the video was shown again.

The show was a huge success, gaining worldwide press. The massive success of the show prompted EPE to draw up plans for a special version of the show to take on the road.

The World Tour 

Starting in 1998, a scaled-down version of the show was taken on tour. The format of the show follows one of Presley's 1970s live concerts, albeit somewhat differently.

The line-up of musicians involved is as follows:
James BurtonLead Guitar
Jerry ScheffBass
After Scheff left the TCB band, he has been replaced on the more recent tours by Norbert Putnam
Ronnie TuttDrums
Tutt is sometimes unable to perform with Presley's band due to pressing worldwide commitments (which include playing drums in Neil Diamond's band). For these shows, he is replaced by his friend and protégé Paul Leim
Glen D. HardinPiano, Keyboards
Joe GuercioOrchestra Conductor

Backing vocals:
The Sweet InspirationsEstelle Brown, Myrna Smith, Portia Brown
The Stamps QuartetEd Enoch, Ed Hill, Royce Taylor, Butch Owens
The ImperialsTerry Blackwood, Joe Moscheo, Sherman Andrus
Millie KirkhamSoprano

Rhythm guitarist John Wilkinson, having suffered a stroke in 1989, was unable to join the band and was replaced by Tony Smith. (However, Wilkinson did join the group at the 25th anniversary concert, held at the Pyramid in Memphis.)

The show was conceived by Todd Morgan, Randy Johnson. Joe Guercio and Stig Edgren.

Produced by Elvis Presley Enterprises and Stig Edgren
Directed and staged by Randy Johnson
Musical Direction by Joe Guercio

Show format 

The format of the show begins with the traditional opening theme of Presley's concerts: "Also sprach Zarathustra" by Richard Strauss (better known as the theme to the movie 2001: A Space Odyssey),followed by the traditionally adopted tune "viva Elvis",  This segues into the song "See See Rider" from Elvis: Aloha from Hawaii.

The show is divided into two different acts, each one 45 minutes to an hour, with an intermission between them. The main material used for the shows comes from Elvis: That's the Way It Is, Elvis: Aloha from Hawaii, and Elvis on Tour. And in recent years songs from the '68 Comeback Special has been added to the mix, most notably the songs "Trouble" (which usually segues into either "Hound Dog" or "That's All Right"), and "If I Can Dream" which is used to end the first act.

During the show, a large video screen hangs above the main set upon which the video of  Presley's performance is projected. Two smaller screens hang on either side, and video of the live musicians, or special video packages are shown.

The first act usually ends with a gospel music segment. If The Imperials are performing, they perform a solo version of "He Touched Me". If the Stamps are performing, they perform an a cappella rendition of "Sweet, Sweet Spirit" (after an introduction by Elvis from the movie Elvis on Tour). After that song, a version of "How Great Thou Art" by Elvis is played with the band. In early shows, this proved to be problematic: since the audio was taken from the 1974 live album Elvis As Recorded Live on Stage in Memphis, but there was no video footage. Thus, the screen was left black, and only the audio was played. After a few tours, a special piece of footage was made from the 1972 movie Elvis on Tour which was edited, sped up, and slowed down in a few places in order to have it match up with the 1974 audio.

The show always ends with Presley's traditional show closer "Can't Help Falling in Love", and the traditional announcement of "Elvis has left the building." At the 1997 and 2002 concerts Presley's former announcer Al Dvorin closed the show by saying "Elvis has left for Graceland".

After a domestic tour (which ended with a show at the Market Square Arena in Indianapolis, IN, the site of Presley's final live concert on June 26, 1977), the show went to Europe, Asia, and Australia.

25th anniversary – 2002 

In 2002, a special 25th anniversary show commemorating the 25th anniversary of Presley's death was held in Memphis, TN at the Pyramid arena. This show was even bigger than the 20th anniversary concert, and featured three different acts. The first act served as a retrospective of Presley's career from 1956 to 1968. Presley's former drummer D.J. Fontana made an appearance, playing drums to footage from one of Presley's appearances on The Steve Allen Show. Saxophonist Boots Randolph made an appearance as well playing sax on "Blue Suede Shoes" and on a performance of "Return to Sender" (taken from his movie Girls! Girls! Girls!) as part of a special section highlighting Presley's career in movies.

Act Two showed the gospel side of Elvis. During a special section of gospel music, a surprise was in store for fans as J.D. Sumner's voice was multi-tracked for a performance (with Elvis and the Stamps) of "Why Me, Lord?" Lisa Marie also made an appearance singing an original song she wrote called "Nobody Noticed It (You're Still Lovely)".

Act 3 was the usual Elvis: the Concert show format and featured new songs, like "Are You Lonesome Tonight?" from That's The Way It Is outtakes. This was the only show in which John Wilkinson, who was Presley's rhythm guitar player from 1969 to 1977, made an appearance. He is not shown on the DVD Elvis Lives, but he can be seen on the fan footage of this show.

30th anniversary – 2007 

On August 16, 2007, Elvis: The 30th Anniversary Concert was held at the Fed-Ex Forum in Memphis and was on a bigger scale than the 20th and 25th anniversary concerts. It featured:
Joe Guercio (musical director and conductor)
the TCB Band members James Burton (lead guitar), Glen D. Hardin (piano), Jerry Scheff (bass), and Ronnie Tutt (drums)
Sweet Inspirations members Myrna Smith, and Estelle Brown
Imperials members Sherman Andrus, Terry Blackwood, Joe Moscheo, and Gus Gaches
Stamps members Bill Baize, Ed Hill, Larry Strickland, and Donnie Sumner
Jordanaires members Gordon Stoker and Ray Walker
D.J. Fontana (drums) and Millie Kirkham (soprano). 

Also appearing:
The Dempseys and members of the Memphis Symphony Orchestra.

The 30th Anniversary featured another duet by Elvis Presley and Lisa Marie Presley. This time singing "In The Ghetto". The video is available for download on iTunes.

Also, a new opening was done for the show which featured a space view of Earth which zoomed in on Memphis and then Graceland, right into the window which led to Presley's bedroom. There, "Elvis" is getting ready for the show with Jerry Schilling giving him his sunglasses. They go down the stairs to the outside of Graceland where they meet up with Joe Esposito and then go into a helicopter. The group flies to the Fed-Ex Forum where audio of Elvis (from the CD An Afternoon in the Garden) says "It's a big place, man". Then they land and go inside the arena, starting the show.

At the show, Priscilla announced that this would be the final show for Elvis: The Concert.

Home media
In 2006, the 2002 25th Anniversary Concert was made available on DVD form in a disc called Elvis Lives. The concert was shown on PBS Stations during the annual pledge week. Elvis Lives only contains Act III (70s Concert) which was a regular Elvis: The Concert segment.

References

External links

Official site

1998 concert tours
Elvis Presley